Reginald M. Oliver (October 20, 1951 – August 14, 2018) was an American football player and coach.

Oliver was a college football quarterback at Marshall University in Huntington, West Virginia from 1970 to 1973. He was one of a small handful of members of the 1970 team who were not on the plane crash that killed all aboard. Oliver was portrayed by actor Arlen Escarpeta in the 2006 film We Are Marshall.

Oliver served as the head football coach at Alabama A&M University in 1994, compiling a record of 4–7.

Head coaching record

References

1951 births
2018 deaths
American football quarterbacks
Alabama A&M Bulldogs football coaches
Jacksonville Sharks (WFL) players
Marshall Thundering Herd football coaches
Marshall Thundering Herd football players
Sportspeople from Tuscaloosa, Alabama
Coaches of American football from Alabama
Players of American football from Alabama
African-American coaches of American football
African-American players of American football
20th-century African-American sportspeople
21st-century African-American sportspeople